Amal Bose (born Amalendu Bose; 194323 January 2012) was a Bangladeshi actor who appeared in theater, television and radio performances. He began his career in stage acting in 1963. His first film appearance was in Raja Sannasi (1966).

Early life 
Bose was born in 1943 in Boalmari, Faridpur, Bangladesh. He started acting in the early 1960s in stage, film, television and radio. He spent the majority of his career in Dhaka. He was married to Sati Bose. They have a daughter, Mandira Bose.
He served as a senior officer of Jute Mills Corporation and retired in 1995.

Career 
While a student of class seven, Bose first performed in a school play, which ignited his interest in acting. Later, he joined a professional Jatra troupe, 'Milon Shangha', in Boalmari, Faridpur.

Theater 
Bose began his career in theatre in Dhaka in 1963 as a theatre director and performer. The then Finance Minister of East Pakistan gave him a gold medal for his performance in a play.  Plays directed by Bose were popular at home and abroad. Over 25,000 people saw the London productions of Siraj-ud-Daulah and Roopban, both Rangdhonu Natya Goshthi productions directed by Bose.

Film 
Bose's first film role was in Raja Sanyashi in 1966. He has appeared in over 400 movies. He directed the film Keno Emon Hoy in the early 1960s. He appeared in the movies Abichar, Neel Akasher Nichey, Sonali Akash, Mohua, Phulshojja, Rangin Gunai Bibi, Chandra Dwiper Rajkonya, Rajlokkhi Srikanto, Hothat Brishti, Ami Shei Meye, Tomakey Chai, and Mon Maney Na. He won a National Film Awards (Bangladesh) for his work in the movie Aajker Protibad.

TV 
Bose acted in a number of TV plays on the Bangladesh Television network starting in 1964. His regular skit "Nana-Nati" in the TV show Ittyadi was popular. He appeared in many TV dramas over his 38-year career.

Notable films

Awards 
Bose won the  National Film Awards for best co-artist' in the film Ajker Protibad, directed by Chashi Nazrul Islam.

Death 
Bose died of a heart attack at the age of 69 on 23 January 2012 in Apollo Hospitals, Dhaka.

References

External links 
 

Bengali male actors
Bangladeshi male film actors
Best Supporting Actor National Film Award (Bangladesh) winners
1943 births
2012 deaths